Lin Wenjie (born 18 May 2004) is a Chinese footballer currently playing as a defender for Hainan Star.

Club career
Lin Wenjie was promoted to the senior team of second tier club Wuhan Three Towns in the 2021 China League One season and was handed his debut in a Chinese FA Cup game on 13 October 2021 against Chongqing Liangjiang Athletic in a 2-0 defeat. In his first season with the club he would be part of the squad that won the division title and gained promotion as the club entered the top tier for the first tine in their history. The following season he was brought back to the youth team and was allowed to join third tier club Hainan Star.

Career statistics
.

Honours

Club
Wuhan Three Towns
China League One: 2021

References

External links 
 

2004 births
Living people
Footballers from Wuhan
Footballers from Hubei
Chinese footballers
China youth international footballers
Association football defenders
Wuhan Three Towns F.C. players
21st-century Chinese people